Little Octobrists (singular) is a Soviet term that first appeared in 1923–1924, and at that time referred to children born in 1917, the year of the October revolution. Later, the term was used as the name of a youth organization for children between 7 and 9 years of age. After the age of nine, in the 3rd grade, Little Octobrists would typically join the Young Pioneer organization.

Little Octobrists were organized in groups each representing one school grade level. The group was divided into subgroups called little stars, of five children each. Each group of Little Octobrists was under the leadership of one Young Pioneer from the Young Pioneer detachment. Every Little Octobrist wore a ruby-coloured five-pointed star badge with the portrait of Vladimir Lenin in his childhood. The symbol of the group was the little red flag.

Description 
On July 18, 1924, the VI Congress of the RLKSM wrote in its resolution "On the organizational development of children's groups": "... it is possible for the communist movement to cover younger children, 8-11 years old, by creating a junior branch of the children's communist movement."

The term "Octobrists" appeared in 1923-1924, when the first groups of children began to appear in Moscow, into which children of the same age as the Great October Socialist Revolution were admitted.

The same resolution of the VI Congress of the RLKSM established the structure of the October organization: a group of Octobrists of 25 children organized under the pioneer detachment was divided into links of 5 people (later the links began to be called asterisks and could reach 7-10 children; according to the regulations on the All-Union Pioneer Organization (1957) .) - up to 8 people; Regulations on the All-Union Pioneer Organization (1967) - 5-6 schoolchildren). The group is led by a Komsomol member allocated by the RLKSM cell and who is an assistant to the leader of the pioneer detachment. The pioneers are in charge of the squads, and October assistants are selected to help the pioneers. There was a group council, which consisted of its leader, link leaders and their assistants, that is, an Octobrist could only be an assistant linkman and an ordinary member of the group board. In 1957, the Octobrists gained the right to lead the stars.
Groups of Octobrists were created in the first grades of schools and operated until the Octobrists entered the pioneers and the formation of pioneer detachments. Initially, after joining the ranks of the Octobrists, children wore a red star sewn on their shirt, on their left chest. Subsequently, the October people began to issue a badge - a five-pointed ruby ​​star with a portrait of Lenin as a child. The group's symbol was the red October flag. The group (in some schools - a detachment) of the Octobrists consisted of several units, called "stars", each of which usually included 5 children - the symbol of a five-pointed star. The principle of creating a detachment of Octobrists was simple: a detachment is a school class. As a rule, in the "star" every October, he held one of the "positions" - the commander of the "star", florist, orderly, librarian, political informer, or sportsman. In some schools, the commander of the "star", at the request of the teachers, sewed a stripe on the sleeve of his tunic (squad leader - 2 stripes).

The activities of the Octobrists took place mainly in a playful way and were organized by teachers and counselors. The All-Union October Week was held annually on April 16-22. At the school for the Octobrists, “Lenin's readings” could be organized, when on the 22nd of each month the appointed senior pupil came to the class and read stories about V.I. Lenin (his birthday was April 22, 1870).

Printed editions 
All-Union magazines (Vesyolye Kartinki and Murzilka for preschool age and elementary grades, Koster, Young Technician and Young Naturalist for pre-pioneer and pioneer age) and republican magazines were published for the Octobrists. For example, in the Moldavian SSR the magazine "Steluza" ("Star") was published in the Moldavian and Russian languages, in the Estonian SSR the magazine "Täheke" ("Star") was published in Estonian. The magazine "Barvinok" was published in Kiev in Russian and Ukrainian. Various pioneer newspapers also published materials intended for the Octobrists.

Annually for the Octobrists, the Malysh publishing house issued the Zvezdochka desk calendar. Methodological materials on work with October were regularly published in the journals "Vozhaty", "Elementary School", "Education of Schoolchildren".

Associations of junior schoolchildren under pioneer and other children's organizations, like the Octobrists, operate in many countries.

The structure of the communist youth organizations of the USSR 

October - primary school students - children aged 7 to 9; (Octobrists were admitted as pioneers in the third grade, excellent students - in the fall, around October 29 or November 7, the rest - in the spring, around April 22.

Pioneers - middle school students (grades 3-4 to 8) - adolescents aged 8 to 15; (Pioneers were accepted into the Komsomol from the age of 14, those who were not accepted into the Komsomol, upon reaching the age of 15, automatically ceased to be pioneers)

Komsomol members - youth aged 14 to 28;

member of Communist Party of the Soviet Union - after 28

Octobrists in Belarus 
Oktyabryonok is a member of the organization at the age of 7 to 10 years. A beginner in pioneering business, ready to accept and continue the traditions and history of the Pioneer. Admission to the organization of junior schoolchildren is carried out in a solemn atmosphere at the gathering of the squad simultaneously with the ritual of conferring the title of "october" (aktsyabrata).

See also 
 Komsomol    
 Murzilka
 Union of Communist Youth

References

 
Youth organizations based in the Soviet Union
Youth organizations established in 1923